Ege is an unincorporated community in Swan Township, Noble County, in the U.S. state of Indiana.

History
A post office was established at Ege in 1885, and remained in operation until it was discontinued in 1903.

Geography

References

Unincorporated communities in Noble County, Indiana
Unincorporated communities in Indiana